Horatio Walpole, 4th Earl of Orford (24 September 1717 – 2 March 1797), better known as Horace Walpole, was an English writer, art historian, man of letters, antiquarian, and Whig politician.

He had Strawberry Hill House built in Twickenham, southwest London, reviving the Gothic style some decades before his Victorian successors. His literary reputation rests on the first Gothic novel, The Castle of Otranto (1764), and his Letters, which are of significant social and political interest. They have been published by Yale University Press in 48 volumes. In 2017, a volume of Walpole's selected letters was published.

The youngest son of the first British Prime Minister, Sir Robert Walpole, 1st Earl of Orford, he became the 4th and last Earl of Orford of the second creation on his nephew's death in 1791.

Early life: 1717–1739

Walpole was born in London, the youngest son of British Prime Minister Sir Robert Walpole and his wife, Catherine. Like his father, he received early education in Bexley; in part under Edward Weston. He was also educated at Eton College and King's College, Cambridge.

Walpole's first friends were probably his cousins Francis and Henry Conway, to whom he became strongly attached, especially Henry. At Eton he formed a schoolboy confederacy, the "Triumvirate", with Charles Lyttelton (later an antiquary and bishop) and George Montagu (later a member of parliament and Private Secretary to Lord North). More important were another group of friends dubbed the "Quadruple Alliance": Walpole, Thomas Gray, Richard West, and Thomas Ashton.

At Cambridge, Walpole came under the influence of Conyers Middleton, an unorthodox theologian. Walpole came to accept the sceptical nature of Middleton's attitude to some essential Christian doctrines for the rest of his life, including a hatred of superstition and bigotry even though he was a nominal Anglican. Ceasing to reside at Cambridge at the end of 1738, Walpole left without taking a degree.

In 1737, Walpole's mother died. According to one biographer, his love for his mother "was the most powerful emotion of his entire life ... the whole of his psychological history was dominated by it". Walpole did not have any serious relationships with women; he has been called "a natural celibate". 

His sexual orientation has been the subject of speculation. He never married, engaging in a succession of unconsummated flirtations with unmarriageable women, and counted among his close friends a number of women such as Anne Seymour Damer and Mary Berry named by a number of sources as lesbian. 

Many contemporaries described him as effeminate (one political opponent called him "a hermaphrodite horse"). Biographers such as Timothy Mowl explore his homosexuality, including a passionate but ultimately unhappy love affair with the 9th Earl of Lincoln. Earlier biographers, such as Lewis, Fothergill, and Robert Wyndham Ketton-Cremer, interpreted Walpole as asexual. 

Walpole's father secured for him three sinecures which afforded him an income: in 1737 he was appointed Inspector of the Imports and Exports in the Custom House, which he resigned to become Usher of the Exchequer, which gave him at first £3900 per annum but this increased over the years. Upon coming of age he became Comptroller of the Pipe and Clerk of the Estreats which gave him an income of £300 per annum. Walpole decided to go travelling with Thomas Gray and wrote a will in which he left Gray all his belongings. 

In 1744, he wrote in a letter to Conway that these offices gave him nearly £2,000 per annum; after 1745 when he was appointed Collectorship of Customs, his total income from these offices was around £3,400 per annum.

Grand Tour: 1739–1741

Walpole went on the Grand Tour with Gray, but as Walpole recalled in later life: "We had not got to Calais before Gray was dissatisfied, for I was a boy, and he, though infinitely more a man, was not enough to make allowances". 

They left Dover on 29 March and arrived at Calais later that day. They then travelled through Boulogne, Amiens and Saint-Denis, arriving at Paris on 4 April. Here they met many aristocratic Englishmen. In early June they left Paris for Reims, then in September going to Dijon, Lyon, Dauphiné, Savoy, Aix-les-Bains, Geneva, and then back to Lyons.

In October they left for Italy, arriving in Turin in November, then going to Genoa, Piacenza, Parma, Reggio, Modena, Bologna, and in December arriving at Florence. Here he struck up a friendship with Horace Mann, an assistant to the British Minister at the Court of Tuscany. In Florence he also wrote Epistle from Florence to Thomas Ashton, Esq., Tutor to the Earl of Plymouth, a mixture of Whig history and Middleton's teachings. In February 1740, Walpole and Gray left for Rome with the intention of witnessing the papal conclave upon the death of Pope Clement XII but  never saw it. Walpole wanted to attend fashionable parties and Gray wanted to visit antiquities. At social occasions in Rome, he saw the Old Pretender, James Francis Edward Stuart, and his two sons, Charles Edward Stuart and Henry Stuart, although there is no record of them conversing.

Walpole and Gray returned to Florence in July. However, Gray disliked the idleness of Florence as compared to the educational pursuits in Rome, and animosity grew between them, eventually leading to an end to their friendship. On their way back to England they had a furious argument, although it is unknown what it was about. Gray went to Venice, leaving Walpole at Reggio. In later life Walpole admitted that the fault lay primarily with himself:

Walpole then visited Venice, Genoa, Antibes, Toulon, Marseille, Aix, Montpellier, Toulouse, Orléans and Paris. He returned to England on 12 September 1741, reaching London on the 14th.

Early parliamentary career: 1741–1754
At the 1741 general election Walpole was elected Whig Member of Parliament for the rotten borough of Callington, Cornwall. He held this seat for thirteen years although he never visited Callington. Walpole entered Parliament shortly before his father's fall from power. In December 1741 the Opposition won its first majority vote in the Commons for twenty years. In January 1742 Walpole's government was still struggling in Parliament although by the end of the month Horace and other family members had successfully urged the Prime Minister to resign after a parliamentary defeat. Walpole's philosophy mirrored that of Edmund Burke, who was his contemporary. He was a classical liberal on issues such as abolitionism and the agitations of the American colonists.

Walpole delivered his maiden speech on 19 March against the successful motion that a Secret Committee be set up to enquire into Sir Robert Walpole's last ten years as Prime Minister. For the next three years, Walpole spent most of his time with his father at his country house Houghton Hall in Norfolk. His father died in 1745 and left Walpole the remainder of the lease of his house in Arlington Street, London; £5,000 in cash; and the office of Collector of the Customs (worth £1,000 per annum). However, he had died in debt, the total of which was in between £40,000 and £50,000.

In late 1745 Walpole and Gray resumed their friendship. Also that year the Jacobite Rising began. The position of Walpole was the fruit of his father's support for the Hanoverian dynasty and he knew that he was in danger: 
"Now comes the Pretender's boy, and promises all my comfortable apartments in the Exchequer and Custom House to some forlorn Irish peer, who chooses to remove his pride and poverty out of some large old unfurnished gallery at St. Germain's. Why really, Mr. Montagu, this is not pleasant! I shall wonderfully dislike being a loyal sufferer in a threadbare coat, and shivering in an antechamber at Hanover, or reduced to teach Latin and English to the young princes at Copenhagen".

Strawberry Hill

Walpole's lasting architectural creation is Strawberry Hill, the home he built from 1749 onward in Twickenham, southwest of London, which at the time overlooked the Thames. Here he revived the Gothic style many decades before his Victorian successors. This fanciful neo-Gothic concoction began a new architectural trend.

Later parliamentary career: 1754–1768

In the House of Commons, Walpole represented one of the many rotten boroughs, Castle Rising, which consisted of underlying freeholds in four villages near Kings Lynn, Norfolk, from 1754 until 1757. At his home, he hung a copy of the warrant for the execution of King Charles I with the inscription "Major Charta" and wrote of "the least bad of all murders, that of a King". In 1756 he wrote:

Walpole worried that while his fellow Whigs fought amongst themselves, the Tories were gaining power, the result of which would be England delivered to an unlimited, absolute monarchy, "that authority, that torrent which I should in vain extend a feeble arm to stem".

In 1757, he wrote the anonymous pamphlet A Letter from Xo Ho, a Chinese Philosopher at London, to his Friend Lien Chi at Peking, the first of his works to be widely reviewed.

In early 1757, old Horace Walpole of Wolterton died and was succeeded in the peerage by his son, who was then an MP for King's Lynn, thereby creating a vacancy. The electors of King's Lynn did not wish to be represented by a stranger and instead wanted someone with a connection to the Walpole family. The new Lord Walpole, therefore, wrote to his cousin requesting that he stand for the seat, saying his friends "were all unanimously of opinion that you were the only person who from your near affinity to my grandfather, whose name is still in the greatest veneration, and your own known personal abilities and qualifications, could stand in the gap on this occasion and prevent opposition and expense and perhaps disgrace to the family". 

In early 1757, Walpole was out of Parliament after vacating Castle Rising until his election that year to King's Lynn, a seat he would hold until his retirement from the Commons in 1768.

Walpole became a prominent opponent of the 1757 decision to execute Admiral John Byng.

Later life: 1768–1788

Without a seat in Parliament, Walpole recognised his limitations as to political influence.

He wrote to Mann critical of the activities of the East India Company on 13 July 1773: 

He opposed the recent Catholic accommodative measures, writing to Mann in 1784: "You know I have ever been averse to toleration of an intolerant religion". He wrote to the same correspondent in 1785 that "as there are continually allusions to parliamentary speeches and events, they are often obscure to me till I get them explained; and besides, I do not know several of the satirized heroes even by sight". His political sympathies were with the Foxite Whigs, the successors of the Rockingham Whigs, who were themselves the successors of the Whig Party as revived by Walpole's father. He wrote to William Mason, expounding his political philosophy:

Last years: 1788–1797

Walpole was horrified by the French Revolution and commended Edmund Burke's Reflections on the Revolution in France: "Every page shows how sincerely he is in earnest — a wondrous merit in a political pamphlet—All other party writers act zeal for the public, but it never seems to flow from the heart". He admired the purple passage in the book on Marie Antoinette: "I know the tirade on the Queen of France is condemned and yet I must avow I admire it much. It paints her exactly as she appeared to me the first time I saw her when Dauphiness. She...shot through the room like an aerial being, all brightness and grace and without seeming to touch earth".

After he heard of the execution of King Louis XVI he wrote to Lady Ossory on 29 January 1793:

He was not impressed with Thomas Paine's reply to Burke, Rights of Man, writing that it was "so coarse, that you would think he means to degrade the language as much as the government".

His father was created Earl of Orford in 1742. Horace's elder brother, the 2nd Earl of Orford, passed the title on to his son, the 3rd Earl of Orford (1730–1791). When the 3rd Earl died unmarried, Horace Walpole became, at the age of 74, the 4th Earl of Orford, and the title died with him in 1797. The massive amount of correspondence he left behind has been published in many volumes, starting in 1798. Likewise, a large collection of his works, including historical writings, was published immediately after his death.

Horace Walpole was buried in the same location as his father Sir Robert Walpole, at the Church of St Martin at Tours on the Houghton Hall estate.

Rumours of paternity
After Walpole's death, Lady Louisa Stuart, in the introduction to the letters of her grandmother, Lady Mary Wortley Montagu (1837), wrote of rumours that Horace's biological father was not Sir Robert Walpole but Carr, Lord Hervey (1691–1723), elder half-brother of the more famous John Hervey. T. H. White writes: "Catherine Shorter, Sir Robert Walpole's first wife, had five children. Four of them were born in a sequence after the marriage; the fifth, Horace, was born eleven years later, at a time when she was known to be on bad terms with Sir Robert, and known to be on romantic terms with Carr, Lord Hervey." The lack of physical resemblance between Horace and Sir Robert, and his close resemblance to members of the Hervey family, encouraged these rumours. Peter Cunningham, in his introduction to the letters of Horace Walpole (1857), vol. 1, p. x, wrote: 

For a portrait of Carr, Lord Hervey, see External links below.

Personal characteristics
The novelist Laetitia Matilda Hawkins, a younger contemporary of Walpole, wrote of him as follows:

In his old age, according to G. G. Cunningham, he "was afflicted with fits of an hereditary gout which a rigid temperance failed to remove".

Writings
Strawberry Hill had its own printing press, the Strawberry Hill Press, which supported Horace Walpole's intensive literary activity.

In 1764, not using his own press, he anonymously published his Gothic novel, The Castle of Otranto, claiming on its title page that it was a translation "from the Original Italian of Onuphrio Muralto". The second edition's preface, according to James Watt, "has often been regarded as a manifesto for the modern Gothic romance, stating that his work, now subtitled 'A Gothic Story', sought to restore the qualities of imagination and invention to contemporary fiction". However, there is a playfulness in the prefaces to both editions and in the narration within the text itself. The novel opens with the son of Manfred (the Prince of Otranto) being crushed under a massive helmet that appears as a result of supernatural causes. However, that moment, along with the rest of the unfolding plot, includes a mixture of both ridiculous and sublime supernatural elements. The plot finally reveals how Manfred's family is tainted in a way that served as a model for successive Gothic plots.

From 1762 on, Walpole published his Anecdotes of Painting in England, based on George Vertue's manuscript notes. His memoirs of the Georgian social and political scene, though heavily biased, are a useful primary source for historians.

Smith, noting that Walpole never did any work for his well-paid government sinecures, turns to the letters and argues that:
Walpole served his country, not by drudgery in the Exchequer and Customs, which paid him, but by transmitting to posterity an incomparable vision of England as it was in his day – London and Westminster with all their festivities and riots, the machinations of politicians and the turmoil of elections.

Walpole's numerous letters are often used as a historical resource. In one, dating from 28 January 1754, he coined the word serendipity which he said was derived from a "silly fairy tale" he had read, The Three Princes of Serendip. The oft-quoted epigram, "This world is a comedy to those that think, a tragedy to those that feel", is from a letter of Walpole's to Anne, Countess of Upper Ossory, on 16 August 1776. The original, fuller version appeared in a letter to Sir Horace Mann on 31 December 1769: "I have often said, and oftener think, that this world is a comedy to those that think, a tragedy to those that feel – a solution of why Democritus laughed and Heraclitus wept."

In Historic Doubts on the Life and Reign of King Richard III (1768), Walpole defended Richard III against the common belief that he murdered the Princes in the Tower. In this he has been followed by other writers, such as Josephine Tey and Valerie Anand. This work, according to Emile Legouis, shows that Walpole was "capable of critical initiative". However, Walpole later changed his views following The Terror and declared that Richard could have committed the crimes he was accused of.

Works

Non-fiction
 Letter from Xo Ho to his Friend Lien Chi at Pekin [1757]
 Anecdotes of Painting in England (1762)
 Catalogue of Engravers [1763]
 On Modern Gardening (1780)
 A Description of the Villa of Mr. Horace Walpole (1784)
 
 Catalogue of Royal and Noble Authors
 Memoirs of the Last Ten Years of George II
 Memoirs of the Reign of George III
 
 Selected Letters, edited and introduced by Stephen Clarke. New York: Everyman's Library, Alfred A. Knopf, 2017. Reviewed by Margaret Drabble

Fiction
 The Castle of Otranto (1764)
 The Mysterious Mother: A Tragedy (1768)
 Hieroglyphic Tales (1785)

Walpole Society
The Walpole Society was formed in 1911 to promote the study of the history of British art. Its headquarters is located in the Department of Prints and Drawings at The British Museum and its director is Simon Swynfen Jervis.

References

Citations

Sources

Further reading

 Frank, Frederick, "Introduction" in The Castle of Otranto.
 
 Hiller, Bevis. findarticles.com Who's Horry now? The Spectator, 14 September 1996

 (IT) Carlo Stasi, Otranto e l'Inghilterra (episodi bellici in Puglia e nel Salento), in 'Note di Storia e Cultura Salentina', anno XV, pp. 127–159, (Argo, Lecce, 2003)
 (IT) Carlo Stasi, Otranto nel Mondo, in 'Note di Storia e Cultura Salentina', anno XVI, pp. 207–224, (Argo, Lecce, 2004)
 (IT) Carlo Stasi, Otranto nel Mondo, dal 'Castello' di Walpole al 'Barone' di Voltaire (Editrice Salentina, Galatina 2018)

External links 

 
 
 The Letters of Horace Walpole, Volume 1 (1735–1748)
 The Letters of Horace Walpole, Volume 2 (1749–1759)
 The Letters of Horace Walpole, Volume 3 (1759–1769)
 The Letters of Horace Walpole, Volume 4 (1770–1797)
 Letters of Horace Walpole, Volume I (1736–1764)
 Letters of Horace Walpole, Volume II (1764–1795)
 The Castle of Otranto
 
 
 Horace Walpole at the Eighteenth-Century Poetry Archive (ECPA)
 The Literary Encyclopedia.
 
 The Friends of Strawberry Hill
 The Twickenham Museum – Horace Walpole
 
 
 Lord Carr Hervey (1691–1723) as a Youth. (National Trust Collections).
 
 "The View From Strawberry Hill: Horace Walpole and the American Revolution"
 Horace Walpole Correspondence | Lewis Walpole Library, Yale University
 
 

|-

1717 births
1797 deaths
18th century in LGBT history
18th-century English historians
18th-century English novelists
18th-century LGBT people
Alumni of King's College, Cambridge
Antiquarians from London
British MPs 1741–1747
British MPs 1747–1754
British MPs 1754–1761
British MPs 1761–1768
Children of prime ministers of the United Kingdom
Orford, Horace Walpole, 4th Earl of
English art historians
English male novelists
English memoirists
Fellows of the Royal Society
LGBT peers
English gay writers
English Landscape Garden style
English LGBT novelists
LGBT members of the Parliament of Great Britain
English LGBT politicians
Members of the Parliament of Great Britain for constituencies in Cornwall
Members of the Parliament of Great Britain for English constituencies
MPs for rotten boroughs
People educated at Eton College
People from Houghton, Norfolk
Politicians from London
Horace
Robert Walpole
Whig (British political party) MPs
Writers from London
Writers of Gothic fiction
Earls of Orford